Assayer may refer to:

 a person carrying out a metallurgical assay
 The Assayer, a 1623 book by Galileo

See also
 Assay, an investigative (analytic) procedure